Sir Grapefellow was a short-lived cereal created by General Mills around 1972 that featured a British World War I era pilot of the same name.  The cereal consisted of "grape flavored oat cereal with sweet grape starbits (marshmallows)".
   
Sir Grapefellow was the nemesis to Baron von Redberry (another 1970s General Mills cereal brand). In the vein of the cereal rivalries Quisp & Quake and Count Chocula & Franken Berry bickering over which one was better, Redberry would proclaim, "Baron Von Redberry is der berry goodest!" and Grapefellow would counter, "Sir Grapefellow is the grapest!"

See also 

 Baron von Redberry

References

External links 

 Image of cereal

General Mills characters
General Mills cereals
Products introduced in 1972
Mascots introduced in 1972
Male characters in advertising
Fictional aviators
Fictional British military personnel